Laurens De Vreese (born 29 September 1988) is a Belgian professional road bicycle racer who last rode for UCI ProTeam . De Vreese was the 2010 Belgian national champion for the road race for riders under 23 years of age, winning the title in Hooglede.

Career
Born in Ghent, De Vreese has competed as a professional since the start of the 2011 season, riding as a member of the  squad. At the 2012 running of Liège–Bastogne–Liège, De Vreese was one of a number of riders to be disqualified from the event as a result of taking a short-cut.

De Vreese left  at the end of the 2013 season and joined  for the 2014 season. Subsequently in August 2014,  announced that De Vreese had signed a one year deal with the squad for 2015. He was named in the startlist for the 2017 Vuelta a España.

Major results

2009
 1st Omloop Het Nieuwsblad U23
 2nd Flèche Ardennaise
2010
 1st  Road race, National Under-23 Road Championships
 1st Overall Topcompetitie
 1st Overall Triptyque Ardennaise
 1st Zillebeke–Westouter–Zillebeke
 2nd Omloop Het Nieuwsblad U23
 3rd Flèche Ardennaise
 4th Overall Tour de Liège
1st Stage 4
 4th Circuit de Wallonie
 5th Heusden Oost-Vlaanderen
 7th Road race, UCI Under-23 Road World Championships
 10th Grote Prijs Stad Geel
2011
 3rd GP Paul Borremans
 3rd Heusden Oost-Vlaanderen
 5th Halle–Ingooigem
 7th GP José Dubois
 10th Overall Tour de Wallonie-Picarde
2012
 1st  Combativity classification Eneco Tour
 2nd Paris–Tours
 4th GP Wanzele
2013
 1st  Combativity classification Tour of Belgium
 1st  Combativity classification Eneco Tour
 6th Overall Tour de l'Eurométropole
 9th Grand Prix of Aargau Canton
 9th Binche–Chimay–Binche
 10th Rund um Köln
 10th Coppa Bernocchi
2014
 3rd Gooikse Pijl
 8th Grote Prijs Jef Scherens
2016
 8th Overall Danmark Rundt

Grand Tour general classification results timeline

References

External links

Topsport Vlaanderen-Mercator profile

Belgian male cyclists
1988 births
Living people
Sportspeople from Ghent
Cyclists from East Flanders